Davis Alexander Grubb (July 23, 1919 – July 24, 1980) was an American novelist and short story writer, best known for his 1953 novel The Night of the Hunter, which was
adapted as a film in 1955 by Charles Laughton.

Biography

Born in Moundsville, West Virginia,  Grubb wanted to combine his creative skills as a painter with writing, and attended the Carnegie Institute of Technology in Pittsburgh, Pennsylvania. However, his color blindness was a handicap he could not overcome and he gave up on painting to dedicate himself to writing fiction. He did, however, make a number of drawings and sketches during the course of his career, some of which were incorporated into his writings.

In 1940, Grubb moved to New York City where he worked at NBC radio as a writer while using his free time to write short stories. In the mid-1940s he was successful in selling several short stories to major magazines and in the early 1950s he started writing a full-length novel. Influenced by accounts of economic hardship by depression-era Americans that his mother had seen firsthand as a social worker, Grubb produced a dark tale that mixed the plight of poor children and adults with that of the evil inflicted by others. The Night of the Hunter became an instant bestseller and was voted a finalist for the 1955 National Book Award. That same year, the book was made into a motion picture that is now regarded as a classic. Deemed "culturally significant" by the Library of Congress, the film was selected for preservation in the United States National Film Registry.

Grubb went on to write a further nine novels and several collections of short stories. His 1969 novel Fools' Parade would also be made into a motion picture starring James Stewart. Some of Grubb's short stories were adapted for television by Alfred Hitchcock and by Rod Serling for his Night Gallery series.

Grubb died in New York City in 1980. His novel Ancient Lights was published posthumously in 1982, and St. Martins Press published 18 of his short stories in a book collection titled You Never Believe Me and Other Stories in 1989.

Bibliography

Novels

The Night of the Hunter (1953)
A Dream of Kings  (1955)
The Watchman  (1961)
The Voices of Glory  (1962)
A Tree Full of Stars  (1965)
Shadow of My Brother  (1966)
The Golden Sickle  (1968)
Fools' Parade  (1969)
The Barefoot Man  (1971)
Ancient Lights  (1982)

Story Collections
Twelve Tales of Suspense and the Supernatural (UK title: One Foot in the Grave) (1964)
The Siege of 318: Thirteen Mystical Stories  (1978)
You Never Believe Me and Other Stories  (1989)

References

Further reading
 Grubb, Louis. "Foreword". Grubb, Davis. You Never Believe Me and Other Stories (1989). p. VII, VII-IX, X-XI

External links

 Davis Grubb, The West Virginia Encyclopedia
 Biography of Davis Grubb, West Virginia Wesleyan College Library

 Davis Grubb drawings, circa 1954, 1973, Margaret Herrick Library, Academy of Motion Picture Arts and Sciences

1919 births
1980 deaths
People from Moundsville, West Virginia
20th-century American novelists
American male novelists
Novelists from West Virginia
American male short story writers
20th-century American short story writers
20th-century American male writers
Writers from West Virginia
Carnegie Mellon University College of Fine Arts alumni